The women's 3000 metres steeplechase competition of the athletics events at the 2011 Pan American Games took place on the 28th October at the Telmex Athletics Stadium.  The defending Pan American Games champion was Sabine Heitling of Brazil.

Records
Prior to this competition, the existing world and Pan American Games records were as follows:

Qualification
Each National Olympic Committee (NOC) was able to enter two athletes regardless if they had met the qualification standard.

Schedule

Results
All times shown are in seconds.

Final
Held on October 28.

References

Athletics at the 2011 Pan American Games
2011
2011 in women's athletics